The 1984 San Jose State Spartans football team represented San Jose State University during the 1984 NCAA Division I-A football season as a member of the Pacific Coast Athletic Association. The team was led by head coach Claude Gilbert, in his first year as head coach at San Jose State. He had been their defensive coordinator for the previous three years. They played home games at Spartan Stadium in San Jose, California. The Spartans finished the 1984 season with a record of five wins and six losses (6–5, 5–2 PCAA).

After the season was over, it was discovered that the UNLV Rebels had used multiple ineligible players during both the 1983 and 1984 season. As a result, San Jose State's loss at UNLV turns into a forfeit win and their record is adjusted to 7–4, 6–1 PCAA.

Schedule

Team players in the NFL
The following were selected in the 1985 NFL Draft.

The following finished their college career in 1984, were not drafted, but played in the NFL.

Notes

References

San Jose State
San Jose State Spartans football seasons
San Jose State Spartans football